Mary Tucker may refer to:

Mary Tucker (sports shooter) (born 2001), American sports shooter
Mary Evelyn Tucker, American professor
Mary Frances Tyler Tucker (1837-1902), American poet
Mary Logan Tucker (1858–1940), American activist